WGL or Wiggle is an API between OpenGL and the windowing system interface of Windows.  WGL is analogous to EGL, which is an interface between rendering APIs such as OpenCL, OpenGL, OpenGL ES or OpenVG and the native platform, as well as to CGL, which is the OS X interface to OpenGL.

See also
CGL – the equivalent OS X interface to OpenGL
GLX – the equivalent X11 interface to OpenGL
EGL – a similar interface between to OpenGL ES and OpenVG and a windowing system; used by Wayland
GLUT – a higher level interface that hides the differences between WGL, GLX, etc.

External links
WGL functions
Tutorial
Technical resources about Windows OpenGL implementation on OpenGL website

3D graphics software
Application programming interfaces
OpenGL